Carex luctuosa is a tussock-forming species of perennial sedge in the family Cyperaceae. It is native to central parts of China.

See also
List of Carex species

References

luctuosa
Taxa named by Adrien René Franchet
Plants described in 1897
Flora of Sichuan
Flora of Shaanxi